Drake Street is a street in Admiralty, Hong Kong. It was named after the Royal Navy ship HMS Drake. A portion of the Admiralty MTR station lies underneath the street.

See also
List of streets and roads in Hong Kong

References

External links
 

Admiralty, Hong Kong
Roads on Hong Kong Island